Hylocharis is a genus of hummingbirds, in the family Trochilidae. It contains two species that are both found in South America.

Taxonomy
The genus Hylocharis was introduced in 1831 by the German naturalist Friedrich Boie. The type species was designated by the English zoologist George Robert Gray in 1840 as the rufous-throated sapphire. The genus name combines the Ancient Greek hulē meaning "woodland" or "forest" with kharis meaning "beauty".

This genus formerly included additional species. A molecular phylogenetic study published in 2014 found that the genus Hylocharis was polyphyletic. In the revised classification to create monophyletic genera, species were moved to Chrysuronia and Chlorestes.

The genus now contains the following two species:
 Rufous-throated sapphire (Hylocharis sapphirina)
 Gilded sapphire (Hylocharis chrysura)

References

 
Taxonomy articles created by Polbot